Penciclovir is a guanosine analogue antiviral drug used for the treatment of various herpesvirus infections. It is a nucleoside analogue which exhibits low toxicity and good selectivity. Because penciclovir is absorbed poorly when given orally (by mouth) it is more often used as a topical treatment. It is the active ingredient in the cold sore medications Denavir (NDC 0135-0315-52), Vectavir and Fenivir. Famciclovir is a prodrug of penciclovir with improved oral bioavailability.

Penciclovir was approved for medical use in 1996.

Medical use
In herpes labialis, the duration of healing, pain and detectable virus is reduced by up to one day, compared with the total duration of 2–3 weeks of disease presentation.

Mechanism of action
Penciclovir is inactive in its initial form. Within a virally infected cell a viral thymidine kinase adds a phosphate group to the penciclovir molecule; this is the rate-limiting step in the activation of penciclovir. Cellular (human) kinases then add two more phosphate groups, producing the active penciclovir triphosphate. This activated form inhibits viral DNA polymerase, thus impairing the ability of the virus to replicate within the cell.

The selectivity of penciclovir may be attributed to two factors. First, cellular thymidine kinases phosphorylate the parent form significantly less rapidly than does the viral thymidine kinase, so the active triphosphate is present at much higher concentrations in virally infected cells than in uninfected cells. Second, the activated drug binds to viral DNA polymerase with a much higher affinity than to human DNA polymerases. As a result, penciclovir exhibits negligible cytotoxicity to healthy cells.

The structure and mode of action of penciclovir are very similar to that of other nucleoside analogues, such as the more widely used aciclovir. A difference between aciclovir and penciclovir is that the active triphosphate form of penciclovir persists within the cell for a much longer time than the activated form of aciclovir, so the concentration within the cell of penciclovir will be higher given equivalent cellular doses.

See also
 Nucleoside analogue
 Famciclovir

References

Anti-herpes virus drugs
Purines